The X68000 is a fourth-generation home computer developed and manufactured by Sharp Corporation, first released only in Japan on March 28, 1987. It was the second and last computer to be released under the Sharp brand, succeeding the X1 series. The following list contains all of the known games released commercially for the X68000 platform.

Featuring an operating system written by Hudson Soft called Human68k and bundled with a conversion of Konami's 1987 arcade game Gradius as the pack-in game at launch, the X68000 was very similar to arcade system boards of the time in terms of hardware and served as the development machine for Capcom's CP System. Many add-ons were released including networking, SCSI, memory upgrades, CPU enhancements and MIDI I/O boards, among others that increased the performance of the system. Multiple revisions were later released that included several enhancements compared to the original model, with the last model being released in 1993 before being officially discontinued in the market, though games for the platform kept being created. Games were also distributed through the Takeru software vending machines, which allowed users to write commercial titles or dōjin soft on blank 5.25" floppy disks. Originally released at JP¥369,000, later models were sold for considerably lower prices. Its unknown how many X68000 units were sold in total during its commercial life span.

Games 
There are currently  games on this list.

See also 
 List of cancelled X68000 games
 Lists of video games

Notes

References

External links 
 List of X68000 games at MobyGames

X68000